Ponte Nizza is a comune (municipality) in the Province of Pavia in the Italian region Lombardy, located about 70 km south of Milan and about 35 km south of Pavia.

Ponte Nizza borders the following municipalities: Bagnaria, Cecima, Godiasco, Gremiasco, Montesegale, Val di Nizza, Varzi.

References

Cities and towns in Lombardy